List of MPs elected in the United Kingdom general election, 1807

This is a list of the MPs or Members of Parliament elected to the House of Commons for the constituencies of the Parliament of the United Kingdom in the 1807 United Kingdom general election, the 4th Parliament of the United Kingdom, and their replacements returned at subsequent by-elections, arranged by constituency.



By-elections 
List of United Kingdom by-elections (1806–18)

See also
List of parliaments of the United Kingdom
Unreformed House of Commons

References

UK MPs 1807–1812
1807 in the United Kingdom
1807